Vyacheslav Mikhailovich Melnikov (born 7 March 1954) is a Russian professional football coach and a former player.

Honours
 Soviet Top League champion: 1984.
 Soviet Top League bronze: 1980.
 Soviet Cup finalist: 1984.
 USSR Federation Cup finalist: 1986.

Manager career
Under his management, FC Zenit Saint Petersburg was relegated from the Russian top-tier Russian Top Division in 1992.

External links
 

1954 births
Living people
People from Pavlovo, Nizhny Novgorod Oblast
Soviet footballers
Association football midfielders
Soviet Top League players
FC Zenit Saint Petersburg players
Russian football managers
FC Zenit Saint Petersburg managers
Russian Premier League managers
FC Dynamo Saint Petersburg managers
FC Volga Nizhny Novgorod players
Sportspeople from Nizhny Novgorod Oblast